Sharlene is an English feminine given name that is a diminutive of Charles. Notable people with the name include:

Sharlene Cartwright-Robinson (born 1971), Turks and Caicos Islands politician
Sharlene Chiu, Canadian television reporter, host, and producer
Sharlene Flores, Trinidad and Tobago singer
Sharlene Heywood (born 1963), Australian cricket player
Sharlene Rädlein (born 1990), Jamaican model and beauty pageant titleholder
Sharlene Royer is a Canadian actress and stunt performer.
Sharlene San Pedro (born 1999), Filipino actress, singer, vlogger, VJ, and TV Host
Sharlene Taulé, better known as Sharlene, (born 1989), Dominican actress and singer and songwriter
Sharlene Wells Hawkes (born 1964), Paraguayan beauty queen, author and sports reporter
Sharlene Whyte, English actress

See also

 Sharleen
 Charlene (given name), including a list of people and fictional characters named Charlene, Charleen or Charlyne
 Charline (name), another given name
 Charlyne

Notes

English feminine given names